Sam Britts (born February 28, 1950) is a retired Canadian football player who played for the Edmonton Eskimos, Detroit Wheels, Hamilton Tiger-Cats and BC Lions. He played college football at the University of Missouri. He was inducted, along with the 1969 University of Missouri Tigers Football team, into the Missouri Sports Hall of Fame on January 25, 2015. He is a graduate of Rosary High School in St. Louis, Missouri.

References

1950 births
Living people
Missouri Tigers football players
Edmonton Elks players
Hamilton Tiger-Cats players
BC Lions players
Detroit Wheels players
American football linebackers
Canadian football linebackers
American players of Canadian football